Bakhtiyor Choriyev (born 19 April 1992) is a Tajikistan player, who currently plays for FK Istaravshan.

Career

Club
On 14 January 2019, Choriyev signed a new contract with FK Khujand.

On 30 July 2021, Khujand announced that Choriyev had left the club to sign for FK Istaravshan.

International
He has been a member of the Tajikistan national football team since 2013.

Career statistics

International

Statistics accurate as of match played 13 November 2016

References

1992 births
Living people
Tajikistani footballers
Tajikistan international footballers
Place of birth missing (living people)
Association football midfielders
Tajikistan Higher League players